CyClones is a first-person shooter video game for MS-DOS developed by Raven Software and published by Strategic Simulations in 1994.

Plot
CyClones is set in the closing of the 20th century, when wars and pollution devastated many countries in the world and led to a policy of isolation for many governments. During this period, episodes of mass hysteria became widespread, and reports of increased UFO sightings and abductions abounded. A number of "E.T. Phobics" joined to create the Advanced Ideas Corporation (A.I.). Partially funded by the U.S. military, the corporation began operating in secret laboratories as the millennium came to a close. The corporation was eventually able to discover and examine a downed alien ship, confirming suspicions of alien activity on the planet. Jubilation over the discovery was short-lived, however, as three days later, the aliens attacked. The attack began with surgical strikes against earth's satellite and missile-control centers. A remarkable discovery about the alien invasion was that most of the invaders were cloned from human tissuesamples, genetically engineered, and then cybernetically enhanced. These humanoids were then dubbed "CyClones" at the time the aliens attacked, A.I. had begun work a prototype of a weapon it dubbed the "HAVOC Unit". Built by combining human technology and alien technology recovered from the alien ship, the HAVOC project resulted in the production of a cybernetically-enhanced fighter with superior combat capabilities, which the U.S. government intended to use to sabotage the main alien operations and locate the main base of operations for the aliens, in order to destroy their leader and cause enough disarray in the enemy forces to allow for their defeat by conventional armies.

Gameplay
The player controls the "HAVOC unit" in a series of missions given by the Earth government to confront and push back the alien invaders and their clone servants. The gameplay follows the standard first-person shooter formula set by Doom the year before, requiring the player to navigate several levels while fighting enemies and activating switches or seeking keys to gain access to different areas. Several missions have specific objectives that must be met before the player is allowed to continue and instructions on what to do next may be displayed on-screen when the player enters a certain area. The enemies encountered include the CyClones humanoids, as well as several robotic and alien creatures. Some enemies are stationary, such as floor or ceiling turrets, and hazards such as explosive barrels are also included. The player can find medikits and "mech-kits" (which serve as armor) in order to ensure their survivability, as well as acquire several weapons which are either human or alien in origin. Later in the game it is possible to acquire an alien suit which grants access to even more powerful weapons, as well as a jetpack that allows the player to fly around the stage.

A distinguishing aspect of CyClones' gameplay is the aiming system. Unlike Doom and most other first person shooter games of the era, CyClones implemented a mouse aiming system, featuring a movable aiming reticle, and allowed players to look up and down, and to jump. The aiming system allows the player to fire their weapon at whatever position they point at in the screen, allowing for significant more accuracy than what the vertical autoaim system employed by most other shooters allowed for. Also unlike Doom, items are picked up not by walking over them but by clicking on them with the mouse. In addition, it is possible to use the mouse to operate the HUD on the screen, in order to for example use an inventory item, switch to another weapon or access the map screen. This control system is very similar than what was later used by the game System Shock.

Development

Development for CyClones started in early 1994, when Raven Software's developers split in two teams: one working with id software's Doom engine to create a fantasy game which later evolved into Heretic, while the other team started on a project that was to use the engine from ShadowCaster to create a futuristic first-person shooter game for Strategic Simulations. However, the ShadowCaster engine had by then become dated, especially when compared to Doom, and so Raven produced a new in-house engine, developed mainly by Carl Stika. The engine was nicknamed "Steam" and offered significant improvements over the Wolfenstein 3D-derived ShadowCaster engine, such as moving platforms, catwalks, sloped floors, and transparent textures. However, the engine was still limited to 90-degree wall geometry, akin to Rise of the Triad and some other shooters of the period.

The game was originally released on floppy disks, featuring a MIDI soundtrack, but was later re-released on a CD in "multimedia enhanced" edition, featuring redbook audio soundtrack and a full motion video (FMV) cutscene that introduces the game and its story.

References

External links
 

1994 video games
DOS games
DOS-only games
First-person shooters
Raven Software games
Single-player video games
Strategic Simulations games
Video games developed in the United States
Sprite-based first-person shooters
Video games with 2.5D graphics